Stringer Brook is a river in Oneida County in the state of New York. It begins west-southwest of Alder Creek and flows into the Mohawk River in North Western.

References 

Rivers of New York (state)
Mohawk River
Rivers of Oneida County, New York